Akram Fouad Khater (Arabic: أكرم فؤاد خاطر; born December 3, 1960) is a Lebanese-born American professor, historian, and author. He serves as a professor of history, and the director of the Moise A. Khayrallah Center for Lebanese Diaspora Studies at North Carolina State University (NCSU). He specializes in the history of Lebanon, Lebanese Studies and diaspora, the Middle Eastern history, and Arab relations.

Biography 
Akram Fouad Khater was born on December 3, 1960 in Lebanon. He immigrated to the United States in 1978, during the Lebanese Civil War. Khater received a B.S. degree from California State Polytechnic University, a M.A. degree in 1987 from the University of California, Santa Cruz, and a Ph.D. from the University of California at Berkeley in 1993.

He is currently developing an undergraduate and masters program on teaching high school world history. He received the NCSU Outstanding Teacher Award for 1998–1999, and the NCSU Outstanding Junior Faculty Award for 1999–2000.

Khater produced the PBS documentary, Cedars in the Pines (2012) about the Lebanese community in North Carolina.

Bibliography

Books

Articles, chapters

References

External links 
 http://faculty.chass.ncsu.edu/akhater/personal/
 Video: Cedars In The Pines (PBS, 2012)

Historians of the Middle East
21st-century American historians
21st-century American male writers
North Carolina State University faculty
University of California, Berkeley alumni
Living people
American male non-fiction writers
1960 births
21st-century Lebanese historians
Lebanese emigrants to the United States